The Hungarian National Bank is the central bank of Hungary and as such part of the European System of Central Banks (ESCB). The Hungarian National Bank was established in 1924 and succeeded the Royal Hungarian State Bank, which introduced the Hungarian forint on 1 August 1946. The Hungarian National Bank lays special emphasis on its international relations and on participation in the professional forums of international economic institutions and financial organisations (EU, IMF, OECD, BIS).

Its principal aim is price stability, but it is also responsible for issuing the national currency, the forint, controlling the money in circulation, setting the Central Bank base rate, publishing official exchange rates, and managing the foreign-exchange reserves and gold to influence exchange rates.

Operations

The Governor of the Hungarian National Bank is appointed by the President of Hungary at the proposal of the Prime Minister for a six-year term. The most important decision-making body of the Hungarian National Bank is the Monetary Council. Its building is located in Liberty Square, in the Inner City of Budapest, next to the U.S. Embassy building.

The MNB maintains a medium-term inflation target of around 3%. This is somewhat higher than the generally accepted level of inflation for price stability in Europe, and it is used in order to allow for Hungary's "price catch-up" to the rest of Europe. Hungary's Central Bank Act states, "The primary objective of the MNB shall be to achieve and maintain price stability. Without prejudice to its primary objective, the MNB shall support the economic policy of the Government using the monetary policy instruments at its disposal".

Demonetised or damaged currency can be exchanged in the bank's head office as well as its two regional offices.

Governors
Sándor Popovics (1924–1935)
Béla Imrédy (1935–1938)
Lipót Baranyai (1938–1943)
Gyula Pósch (1943–1944)
László Temesváry (1944)
Imre Oltványi (1945)
Artúr Kárász (1945)
Imre Oltványi (1945–1946)
Ernő Csejkey (1946–1949)
Ferenc Jeszenszky (1949–1952)
János Vörös (1952–1955)
László Háy (1956–1956)
Dénes Szántó (1956–1960)
Béla Sulyok (1960–1961)
Andor László (1961–1975)
Mátyás Tímár (1975–1988)
Ferenc Bartha (1988–1990)
Surányi György (1990–1991)
Péter Ákos Bod (1991–1994)
György Surányi (1995–2001)
Zsigmond Járai (2001–2007)
András Simor (2007–2013)
György Matolcsy (2013-Present)

History

In the Austria-Hungary era the Austro-Hungarian Bank was the central bank of the Monarchy, but after World War I, it was dissolved and the new Royal Hungarian State Bank was established. The first independent Hungarian central bank, the National Bank of Hungary, commenced operations on 24 June 1924, in the form of a company limited by shares. Hungary's Central Bank Act founded the Hungarian National Bank.

The October 1991 Act on the National Bank of Hungary reinstated central bank independence. The Act LVIII of 2001 on the Magyar Nemzeti Bank established the Hungarian government and the MNB as the policy makers determining the exchange-rate regime. Since 26 February 2008, the forint has floated freely against the euro.

Hungary was supposed to join the eurozone in 2010, which would have resulted in the MNB losing control of monetary policy, but central bank leaders criticized this plan, saying that the fiscal austerity requirements would slow growth. In December 2011 two of the three major credit rating agencies downgraded Hungarian long term currency debt to "junk status", due in part to changes to the Constitution of Hungary, creating doubts about the independence of the central bank. On 20 May 2016, Fitch Ratings upgraded Hungary's corresponding debt status to BBB- (which is investment grade), assigning a stable outlook to the rating. The upgrade was mainly motivated by, among other factors, high current account surpluses, high European Union (EU) fund inflows, banks' external deleveraging, the central bank's self-financing programme and foreign currency mortgage conversion reducing Hungary's external debt and financial vulnerability.

Hungarian National Bank's building

See also

Economy of Hungary
Hungarian forint

References

External links
  

Banks of Hungary
Central banks
Magyar
Buildings and structures in Budapest
1924 establishments in Hungary
Banks established in 1924
Art Nouveau architecture in Budapest
Art Nouveau government buildings